Quinault may refer to:

 Quinault people, an Indigenous people of the Pacific Northwest Coast
Quinault Indian Nation, a federally recognized tribe
Quinault language, their language

People 
Quinault family of actors, including
 Jean-Baptiste-Maurice Quinault (1687–1745), comedian and musician
 Jeanne Quinault (1699–1783), actor, bluestocking saloniste
 Philippe Quinault a French dramatist and librettist (1635–1688)
 Marie-Anne-Catherine Quinault (1695–1791), French singer and composer

Places
 Quinault Canyon 
 Lake Quinault
 Quinault River, a river located on the Olympic Peninsula in the U.S. state of Washington
 Quinault Pass
 Quinault Rainforest
 Quinault, Washington

Other
 Quinault Treaty, signed in 1855
 MV Quinault, a Steel Electric Class ferry previously part of the Washington State Ferry system
 Château Quinault, a Saint-Émilion winery

French-language surnames